Eshaqabad (also romanized as Esḩāqābād; also known as Esḩāqābād-e Shīneh) is a village in Qalayi Rural District, Firuzabad District, Selseleh County, Lorestan Province, Iran. At the 2006 census, its population was 82, in 19 families.

References 

Towns and villages in Selseleh County